The V type carriages, introduced from 1897, were the first group of Victorian Railways passenger rolling stock to have their own distinct class.

Despite some records, these classes were never "doubled" to reflect their bogies; for example, the class AVAV never existed.

AV

In the closing years of the 19th century, the Victorian Railways found itself in need of more passenger carriages.

In 1897, a design was settled upon, and carriage AV285 was constructed and brought into use. The number 285 was a follow-on from the AA class of carriages, the last of those having been numbered 284. The "V" indicated that the carriage was of a vestibule design, with a walk-through connection to the next carriage.

It was the first passenger carriage to include toilets, which were becoming more important, given the longer journeys that could be undertaken by then.

With the trial judged a success, construction of carriages 286 and 287 was continued. However, all three cars were renumbered to the AV1-3 series prior to service. By 1898, cars AV 1-7 were all in revenue service, and they were joined by AVs 8-35 by the end of 1899.

Some of the carriages were used as "joint stock", for running between Melbourne and Adelaide, and entered that service directly from the production line. The symbol OA class was painted on their frames, although that was never officially recorded. OAs 31, 32, 34 and 35 were AV 31, 26, 5 and 11 in that order. The cars returned to their AV designations in about 1907, but maintained their alternative designs, having only four doors per side instead of the normal six (doors two and five were deleted, and the space was replaced with wider windows). Cars AV 21 and 23 also had some role in Melbourne-Adelaide services, but it is not known whether they were ever recoded.

The carriages were kept in service until the early 1960s, being withdrawn and scrapped between 1962 and 1970. However, a handful of cars were retained, with some being converted for use in the Display Train (see below), and some for heritage operations.

BV

In parallel with the production of the AV class, second class vehicles were also constructed. The same dimensions and general layout were used, with construction lasting through 1898 and 1899. A total of 25 vehicles were built, numbered from BV1 to BV25.

Again, joint stock vehicles were drawn from the class. OBs 33 and 36 were converted from BV's 23 and 6 respectively - however they were never officially recorded as the OB class.

The last use of the class was 18BV in the final run of R766 as a coal burner, from Melbourne to Ballarat on December 19th 1999.

Steamrail Ballarat intended to restore a number of the cars to active heritage status, and to that end 7BV was fitted with a kiosk in one of the compartments.

CV, DV

Usually, when the Victorian Railways developed a new type of passenger car, they also produced a matching guards van. The V series was no different, with DV1 and DV2 being constructed in 1898.

Those vans were fitted with guard's compartments at each end, and had a large baggage area in the centre. Vans 1 and 2 had small side projections known as "duckets", which were used by the guard to peer along the side of the train through narrow windows. That was in lieu of the more regular raised observation compartments, and so CV's 1 and 2 were unique for their era in having flat roofs.

In 1906, the class was increased, with DV3 to DV7 brought into service. None of those vans had duckets, instead returning to the norm of raised observation areas. Those vans also had three double-doors per side rather than two.

In the 1910 recoding, the DV class was recoded to CV, but the numbers were unchanged. The class outlasted the AV and BV passenger carriages by about two decades, with all vans still in service in 1980. Over time, the class had their timber sides replaced with steel sheeting, and vans 3-7 had their louvres replaced with flat panels, but otherwise they remained in as-built condition for most of their lives.

State Car 2 (Alexandra/Melville) & State Car 3 (Edward/Carey)

State Cars 2 and 3 were built in 1901 at Newport Workshops, and entered service on 30 April that year. The two cars were largely based on the existing V type carriage design, with a  body and  bogie centres. The main difference was the roof style, which was clerestory but with curved ends as would be applied to the later E type carriages. While under construction, official correspondence referred to the two vehicles as Royal carriages. After entry to service, State Car No.2 was named Alexandra and Stare Car No.3 was named Edward. The names appear on the carriage drawings centred above the windowline, but no photos exist of the cars to indicate whether they were applied.

The official diagrams issued in the Victorian Railways 1904 and 1908 rolling stock registers mixed up the two underframes, with Alexandra being marked as State Car No.3 and Edward as State Car No.2, and their marked tare weights also being swapped.

State Car 2 Alexandra had two  saloons, one either end, joined by a corridor serving two lavatories, a private sitting compartment for eight, and an attendant's compartment with room for three including a small stove. Four doors were provided on each side, to access the saloons and the compartments (or the corridor directly opposite the compartments). Because of the internal layout the doors were not uniformly spaced.

The car was accessed via the end diaphragms or via the four doors either side, which were roughly equally spaced.

Both cars were removed from Royal Train duties in 1919, following the successful introduction of State Car No.4 based on the E type carriage design, which had sufficient facilities to cover both the earlier cars' roles in a special consist.

Alexandra
Alexandra'''s body was lifted in 1919, and the frame was cut in half and a  section was spliced into the frame. The end diaphragms were removed and replaced with  platforms, and the interior was rebuilt. The ladies' lavatory was abolished, and the compartments were reorganised to a small attendant's storage closet, then a conductor's compartment. The former men's lavatory was made unisex, but split into the lavatory section and a shower section; the latter only accessible from the former mens-end saloon. The four external body doors either side were all sealed but their window spacing was retained, and access to the car was exclusively via the end platforms. In the new form, the car was named Melville.

Melville
Between 1932 and 1935 the car was leased by Jack Young of Ballarat, who used the car as a mobile radio station broadcasting to towns in the region for three to six days. During this period the car had "MOBILE BROADCASTING SERVICE" above the windowline, and "3YB" - the car's callsign - below.

A further rebuild in 1952 saw the long saloon cleared out, with the space instead used for a four-cylinder A.E.C engine and Stones 44/29 T.E.F.C. Generator; the conductor's compartment was rebuilt as a kitchen area, and the short saloon was fitted with two bunk beds and wardrobes.

The car was repainted to Victorian Railways blue and yellow in 1959, and fitted with 50 ton aligned bogies in 1989. It was used on the Train of Knowledge to provide power for heating and lighting (and air conditioning for some vehicles), and when that service was withdrawn it was allocated to the Seymour Rail Heritage Centre.

In 2018 a proposal to refurbish the carriage was floated on behalf of the Mornington Railway Preservation Society, requesting $109,000 for restoration "as a mobile showpiece and educational experience". However, the project did not receive enough community support and, as of late 2018, remains unfunded. Despite this, the vehicle was trucked from Newport Workshops to Moorooduc in September 2018.

EdwardEdward was modified in 1919, with the ladies' end compartment abolished and replaced with three showers, the attendant's compartment seat modified allowing conversion to a sleeping berth, and the car was renamed Carey. A new underframe was placed under the vehicle, based on the Tait motor carriage outside-channel construction, but the car length was retained. The car was damaged at Seymour and taken off register in June 1955, and scrapped at Newport Workshops on 28 June 1961. The name Carey'' was recycled on a guard's van that became the new shower car.

The Display Train

As new carriages were introduced in the mid-1960s, it was found that the V-series passenger cars were becoming surplus. Rather than scrapping the fleet, in 1966 cars AV 22, 4, 6 and 29 lost the AV classification and became cars 1-4. in 1968 these were joined by BV's 9 and 21, these being renumbered simply "5" and "6". In 1975 guards van CV2 was modified to become a power generator for the set, but it was not externally altered.

The carriage interiors were obliterated and replaced with advertising material; the outsides were sheathed in aluminium cladding, essentially creating a set of billboards on wheels. However the original carriages were more-or-less retained under the shell; photos exist of some of the carriages with the shell half-removed , revealing the passenger car's original exterior in worse-than-average condition.

Of course the train was not in use every day, and for most of its life it was stored in Newport Workshops, with tours about every two years. By the 1980s it was obvious the idea was a mistake, and the train was withdrawn from service. Display Car 1 was sold privately in Rosebud, on 20 July 1982, and Display Car 2 to the Blue Lake Model Railway Society in Mount GambierNewsrail March 1989 p73 on 24 January 1983. The remaining vehicles 3-6 were sold to St George Metal Co., a metal recycling company in Coburg, on 2 February 1983.

The Vintage Train

Most of the carriages predating the V subtype had been withdrawn by the late 1960s and scrapped, so these were the only carriages remaining that could serve as a "vintage train" for leasing. Remaining V type carriages were not required for daily service, so they were instead put aside from normal running, intended to be used on specials. The train ran from 1967 to 1983, after which the remaining carriages were formally entered into the state heritage register.

First class accommodation on the train was provided with AV cars in the group 1, 12, 16, 23 (Parlor), 30, 32 (Parlor) and 35, along with 45ABL, 12BL/Pioneer and 13BL/Enterprise. 12AV only lasted to 1970 and 16AV for only a few months, but the rest of the cars ran right through to 1983 and all bar 35AV were preserved with that last unit written off.

Second class carriages included most of the BV fleet - cars 1, 3–8, 10–11, 15-20 and 24. Cars were run until in need of maintenance, then withdrawn and scrapped. The first to go was 20BV in 1967, only a few months after the train had started running. This was followed in 1968 with class members 10BV, 16BV, 17BV and 24BV, and in 1970 cars 4BV, 5BV, 11BV and 15BV. In 1973 6BV was also scrapped. The remainder - 1, 3, 7, 8, 18 and 19, were retained until 1981 when 1BV was scrapped; the rest entered formal preservation sometime between 1981 and 1983.

Other cars known to have been included were some BC vans, with one end fitted with dual couplings since the R Class locomotives - then the most popular choice for heritage steam specials - were not compatible with screw couplings. When the BC cars were removed from service, the function of conversion cars was taken up by ABU carriages, about half of which had dual- or screw-couplings on at least one end.

Disposal and Preservation
The vast majority of carriages listed on this page were destroyed and burnt as a quick, easy form of disposal. Some were sold as sheds or a cheap form of housing, and a handful were retained for preservation.

The current known remnants are:
 1AV, 32AV; 3BV, 7BV, 8BV, 18BV, 19BV, 12BL (Enterprise) and 13BL (Pioneer) are at Newport Workshops, East Block.
 30AV formerly at Trentham
 1CV at Ballarat East
 5CV at Moorooduc
 6CV was sold privately, and as of February 2019 it was listed on Facebook for purchase.
 7CV was held by Seymour Rail Heritage Centre for a number of years; on 20 September 2015 it was transferred to Moorooduc for restoration, so that it can replace 5CV on tourist train duties, allowing that vehicle to be overhauled.

Model Railways

O Scale
Veteran Models has released AV, BV & CV brass and whitemetal kits in 0 Scale (1:48).

HO Scale
Blue and Gold Models will be producing an HO scale resin kit of the V-series passenger carriages, with brass bogies supplied by Trainbuilder. CV's 3 to 7 have been produced as a resin kit by Lyndon's Basic Australian Trains; the kit is designed to represent 1960's onwards but can be backdated with additional handrails.
As of May 2019 Trainbuilder are producing AV, BV, ABL, CV passenger cars

It would likely be far easier to scratchbuild a display train, rather than converting a V kit.

References

Victorian Railways carriages